Jimmy Giles (born 21 April 1946) as an English former footballer and manager. As a player, he was known as 'Farmer'.

Born in Kidlington, Oxfordshire, Giles played in the Football League for Swindon Town, Aldershot, Exeter City, Charlton Athletic and Exeter City again before leaving to become player-manager of Yeovil Town in 1981, a position he held until 1983. He has since worked for BBC Radio Devon and as a scout for sometime Charlton assistant manager Keith Peacock.

Giles was also an accomplished cricketer. He played for Worcestershire 2nd XI as a fast bowler and hard-hitting batsman.

References

● Playfair football annuals 1966-67 to 1981-82

1946 births
Living people
People from Kidlington
Sportspeople from Oxfordshire
English footballers
Association football central defenders
Kidlington F.C. players
Swindon Town F.C. players
Aldershot F.C. players
Exeter City F.C. players
Charlton Athletic F.C. players
Yeovil Town F.C. players
Yeovil Town F.C. managers
English Football League players
English football managers